Linda Spilker is an American planetary scientist who served as the project scientist for the Cassini mission exploring the planet Saturn. Her research interests include the evolution and dynamics of Saturn's rings.

Career
Spilker received a B.A.in Physics from California State University, Fullerton in 1977 and an M.S. in Physics from California State University, Los Angeles in 1983.  She obtained a Ph.D. in Geophysics and Space Physics from UCLA in 1992. She joined the Jet Propulsion Laboratory in 1977, initially working on the Voyager missions that were launched the same year. She became a Cassini mission scientist in 1990. In 1997, she was the editor of a NASA publication that summarizes the mission's legacy. In 2010 she became the Cassini mission project scientist, a role in which she directed the entire team's scientific investigations. She has appeared as herself in multiple television documentary programs, including several in the PBS Nova series.

Honors and awards
 NASA Exceptional Service Medal (2013)
 NASA Group Achievement Award (2011, 2009, 2000, 1998, 1982–1989)
 NASA Scientific Achievement Award (1982)

See also
List of women in leadership positions on astronomical instrumentation projects

References

American scientists
Living people
1955 births
University of California, Los Angeles alumni
UCLA Department of Earth Planetary and Space Sciences alumni
California State University, Fullerton alumni
Recipients of the NASA Exceptional Service Medal
Planetary scientists
Women planetary scientists
NASA people